Local elections were held in Algeria on 12 June 1990, the first multi-party elections since independence in 1962. The result was a victory for the Islamic Salvation Front, which won majorities on more than half of the Popular Communal Assemblies and Popular Wilaya Assemblies, receiving around 70% of the vote in Algiers, Constantine and Oran.

Results

Popular Communal Assemblies

Popular Wilaya Assemblies

References

Algeria
1990 in Algeria
1990
June 1990 events in Africa